Ville Jussi Sirén (born February 11, 1964 in Tampere, Finland) is a retired Finnish professional ice hockey defender.

He is currently the head amateur scout for the Columbus Blue Jackets. He has previously worked as a scout for the St. Louis Blues, Washington Capitals and Ilves.

Career statistics

Regular season and playoffs

International

External links
 
 Columbus Blue Jackets Staff Directory
 St.Louis Blues scout

1964 births
Living people
Columbus Blue Jackets scouts
Finnish ice hockey defencemen
Finnish expatriate ice hockey people in Switzerland
Hartford Whalers draft picks
HIFK (ice hockey) players
HPK players
Ice hockey players at the 1984 Winter Olympics
Ice hockey players at the 1992 Winter Olympics
Ilves players
EHC Kloten players
Luleå HF players
Minnesota North Stars players
Olympic ice hockey players of Finland
Pittsburgh Penguins players
SG Cortina players
St. Louis Blues scouts
SC Bern players
Ice hockey people from Tampere
VIK Västerås HK players
Washington Capitals scouts